The 2020 Scottish Women's Premier League Cup was the 20th edition of the SWPL Cup competition, which began in 2002. The competition was to be contested by all 18 teams of the two divisions of the Scottish Women's Premier League (SWPL 1 and SWPL 2) and they were divided into four qualifying groups. However Forfar Farmington withdrew after playing just one match, so only 17 teams continued in the competition. Forfar's withdrawal made Dundee United's 10–0 win in the first match of the group stages null and void.

Ranking within each qualifying group was based on

 total points,
 then goal difference,
 then goals scored.

Group A

Games

Group B

Matches
The Dundee United game was recorded as Null and Void.

Group C

Matches

Group D

Table 
Hearts and Partick Thistle were awarded 3-0 defeats after naming a trialist in their match squads.

Matches

Quarter-finals

The quarter-final draw was held on Monday 30 August.

Semi-finals
The draw for the Semi-finals was held at Firhill Stadium 1 November 2021.

Final

References

External links
Scottish Women's Premier League Cup

Scot
Premier League